Fausto Carrera (born 12 March 1950) is an Ecuadorian former footballer. He played in two matches for the Ecuador national football team in 1975. He was also part of Ecuador's squad for the 1975 Copa América tournament.

References

External links
 

1950 births
Living people
Ecuadorian footballers
Ecuador international footballers
Place of birth missing (living people)
Association football defenders
C.D. Universidad Católica del Ecuador footballers
S.D. Quito footballers
Ecuadorian football managers
Delfín S.C. managers
S.D. Aucas managers
C.D. Universidad Católica del Ecuador managers
S.D. Quito managers